Jef Gaitan (born September 21, 1989) is a Filipino actress who first started as a TV commercial model and the year 2009 she joined Survivor Philippines Palau which was aired on GMA Network. She finished the season as one of the top three in the finale episode of Survivor Philippines Palau. Gaitan later on became a semi regular in Party Pilipinas. she had a one-month stint on GMA's Dear Friend which she co-starred with Marvin Kiefer, Jennylyn Garcia and Carl Guevara.

She also appeared on various TV5 series such as Ang Utol Kong Hoodlum, Bangis as Inang Filomena and The Sisters.

In 2013, she worked on ABS CBN's late night comedy gag show Banana Nite.

From 2014 to 2015, she became a co-host for News+ in ABS-CBN Sports and Action, handling Entertainment News with Anthony Taberna as the Anchor for the news program.

In 2016, Gaitan was part of the drama fantasy series, My Super D as Apple.

In 2020, Jef was part of the drama series offering of ABS-CBN, Ang sa Iyo ay Akin, aired on Kapamilya Channel.

Filmography

Television

Movies

Awards and recognition

FHM rankings
Gaitan first appeared for FHM Philippines with Wendy Valdez on "Zoo themed" cover in October 2010, 3 years later she was reappeared for Empress Schuck cover FHM 13th Anniversary special also featuring Valdez, Chloe Dauden and Karen Bordador. She also appeared on Online Babe (now FHM Idols) section for October 2013, three months later Gaitan joined with former Sexbomb Sunshine Garcia and former Wowowee dancer Aiko Climaco dubbed as Banana Nite Girls cover for January 2014.

References

1989 births
Living people
Actresses from Laguna (province)
Filipina gravure idols
Filipino female models
Participants in Philippine reality television series
Survivor Philippines contestants
GMA Network personalities
TV5 (Philippine TV network) personalities
ABS-CBN personalities
Star Magic
Viva Artists Agency